Mark Cox (born 5 July 1943) is a former tennis player from England, who played professional and amateur tennis in the 1960s, 1970s and 1980s. He was ranked as high as world No. 13 on the ATP rankings (achieving that ranking in August 1977). Cox was educated at Wyggeston Grammar School in Leicester and Millfield School in Somerset.

Cox obtained an economics undergraduate degree from the University of Cambridge (Downing College), where he was a member of the Cambridge University Lawn Tennis Club.

Career
He played his first tournament on 3 November 1958 at the Torquay Indoor. During his career, he won twenty singles titles and three doubles titles spanning both the pre-Open Era and Open Era, reached the quarterfinals at the U.S. National Championships (in 1966), and the final at the event in Cincinnati (in 1977). He also played for Great Britain's Davis Cup team, and was on the team that reached the 1978 final against the United States. He has also gone down in tennis history as the first amateur player to beat a professional.

In May 1968, at the British Hard Court Championships at Bournemouth, he beat the American Pancho Gonzales in five sets in two and a quarter hours. Cox also achieved big upset wins over No. 1 seed, Rod Laver, at the 1971 Australian Open, and over No. 2 seed, Ken Rosewall, at the 1972 US Open. Cox defeated future world No. 1 Jimmy Connors in his debut Grand Slam match at the 1970 US Open. He retired from playing in 1981. After his final title in 1977 it would take another 17 years for a British player to win a top level tour title (Jeremy Bates at Seoul in 1994). To date he is the last English born male to win a top level UK tournament on grass (Eastbourne in 1973). During his latter playing years and after his retirement, Cox has worked as a coach, and also as a television commentator for the BBC.

Personal life
Cox is a Patron of a charity "CRY" (Cardiac Risk in the Young) and an ambassador for the Win Tennis Academy at Bisham. He lives with his wife Susie in London.

Career finals

Singles: 35 (21 titles, 14 runner-ups)

Doubles: 11 (3 titles, 8 runner-ups)

References

External links
 
 
 

1943 births
Living people
Alumni of Downing College, Cambridge
English sports broadcasters
English male tennis players
People educated at Wyggeston Grammar School for Boys
People educated at Millfield
Sportspeople from Leicester
Tennis commentators
British male tennis players
Tennis people from Leicestershire